Caramoran, officially the Municipality of Caramoran,  is a 3rd class municipality in the province of Catanduanes, Philippines. According to the 2020 census, it has a population of 32,114 people.

The main sources of livelihood of the town are growing rice, coconuts, and lasa and fishing. The white beaches and clean sea water of Toytoy and Sabang, the water falls of Ab-haw, Awinis and Garagag are some of the attractions, and together with the Hilacan River, are the main source of water for irrigation.

History

The early Spanish missionaries who came to the Philippines landed in Napacahan, a sitio in Tubli and established a parish, which lasted for many years. In the parish church, St. John the Baptist had been venerated until this day as the Patron Saint (feast day June 24).

Early Caramoran history disclosed the fact that the town originated in Napacahan, but due to relentless and repeated Muslim piracy in the 17th to the 18th century, the town was transferred to its present site Caramoran poblacion where the Muslim pirates could not anchor because of barrier reefs.

Over a hundred years after Spanish Sovereignty was established in 1570, Caramoran was founded as a town in 1676 side by side with the Catholic Church.

In the early colonial era, Catanduanes was only composed of two towns. The first, Viga, was founded in 1619 under the incumbency of Governor-General Manuel de Leon. In 1676, he established another town, which is now the municipality of Caramoran.

There are at least two possible origins of the name Caramoran. Old people of the town of Caramoan in Camarines Sur theorized that since their town is only separated almost 2 kilometers by Maqueda Channel from Caramoran in Catanduanes, the place also abound in “cara”, the turtle's precious shell made into combs, bowls and decorative articles. Hence, a place where turtle “cara” shells are found in abundance, as in Caramoan. Another version is that this place is where “namo”, wild plants that grow on vines with edible roots, are plentiful; Caramoran has this plant growing in abundance. These two towns are both far from their provincial capital and as such the inhabitants are closely knit in many aspects.

The municipal government ceased to exist when Caramoran was fused to the Municipality of Pandan in 1906, only to be resurrected following the incessant demand of the people under the leadership of then Don Camilo Rubio.

The late ex-Congressman Francisco Perfecto fathered the bill in congress recreating Caramoran as an independent municipality. On August 29, 1948, then President Elpidio Quirino signed Republic Act No. 159 re-creating the municipality of Caramoran. Cong. Perfecto filed a bill “Outlawing Storm” and this fact made Catanduanes known to the world because the beautiful island lies in the typhoon belt, perhaps without destructive storms in this province, especially this municipality of Caramoran must have prospered and developed fast.

Geography
From Tabaco, Albay, it can be reached by chartering a small passenger/cargo motorboat direct to Caramoran, or commercial ferry services like the M/V Eugenia, Starferry, or the fast sea vessel M/V Calixta to San Andres (Calolbon). From Virac or San Andres, a passenger jeepney or mini bus can be taken to Caramoran.

The municipality has the largest land area of the municipalities in the province.

Caramoran is bounded on the north by the municipality of Pandan, on the east by the municipalities of Viga, Panganiban and Bagamanoc, on the south by the municipalities of San Andres and Virac, on the west by Maqueda Channel.

Barangays
Caramoran is politically subdivided into 27 barangays.

Climate

Caramoran has a tropical rainforest climate (Af) with heavy to very heavy rainfall year-round and with extremely heavy rainfall in January.

Demographics

Economy

References

External links
Municipality of Caramoran
 [ Philippine Standard Geographic Code]
Philippine Census information

Municipalities of Catanduanes